Sir Geoffrey James Foot (20 July 1915 – 4 May 2009) was a Tasmanian politician. He was born in Launceston, and served as a member of the Tasmanian Legislative Council for the seat of Cornwall from 1961 to 1972. He was knighted in 1984.

Foot was a notable Christian, serving as President of the Conference of Churches of Christ in Victoria and Tasmania in 1980. He was also National Treasurer of the Bible Society of Australia for many years.

References

1915 births
2009 deaths
Independent members of the Parliament of Tasmania
Members of the Tasmanian Legislative Council
Politicians from Launceston, Tasmania
Australian Knights Bachelor
Australian politicians awarded knighthoods
Australian members of the Churches of Christ
Australian Christian religious leaders
Politicians awarded knighthoods
20th-century Australian politicians